Marco Alvarez may refer to:

 Marco Álvarez (born 1972), Spanish musician
Marco Alvarez, character in 3%

See also
Marcos Álvarez (born 1991), German footballer
Marco Antonio Alvarez Ferreira (born 1964), Brazilian footballer
Marcos Álvarez Pérez, Mexican politician